Kerkyra Stadium is a multi-purpose stadium in Kerkyra, Greece. It is currently used mostly for football matches and is the home stadium of A.O. Kerkyra. The stadium holds 3.000 people and was built in 1961.

History
The stadium is part of Corfu's National Athletic Center (EAC). It has two stands, one large west and one smaller east, built in 1973. Chrysopatas was first placed in 1983. In 2003, headlamps were installed, while in 2005 all platforms were covered with plastic seats. The construction of the shelter over the big stand was made in 2007. In 2010, a 200-seat slot was delivered as a temporary solution, but it is basically not used (no tickets are issued for it). The capacity of the new petal is projected to be 1,230 seats, though when completed.

External links
Kerkyra Stadium Pics stadia.gr

A.O. Kerkyra
PAE Kerkyra
Football venues in Greece
Multi-purpose stadiums in Greece
Buildings and structures in Corfu (city)